A Woman's Eyes is a 1916 American silent Western film featuring Harry Carey.

Cast
 Harry Carey
 Olive Carey (billed as Olive Fuller Golden)
 Joe Rickson
 Doc Crane

See also
 Harry Carey filmography

External links
 

1916 films
1916 Western (genre) films
1916 short films
American silent short films
American black-and-white films
Films directed by George Marshall
Silent American Western (genre) films
1910s American films